Snapp is a village in Västerbotten County, Sweden.

Snapp or SNAPP may also refer to:

 Science for Nature and People Partnership, a nature conservation initiative
 Snapp!, a transportation network company operating in Iran
 SNAPPs, an artificially designed polymer

People 
Helen Wyatt Snapp (1918–2013), American aviator
Henry Snapp (1822–1895), American politician
Howard M. Snapp (1855–1938), American politician
Red Snapp (1888–1974), American baseball player
Wilbur Snapp (1920–2003), American musician

See also 
 Snapp House (disambiguation)
 Snapper (disambiguation)
 Snappy (disambiguation)
 Snap (disambiguation)